

List of naval battles of the French Revolutionary Wars

Naval battles of the French Revolutionary Wars